Elias Xitavhudzi was a South African serial killer who murdered 16 women in Atteridgeville, South Africa, in the 1950s. Xitavhudzi targeted only whites in the then-strictly segregated community. His killing spree caused a local sensation during the peak years of South Africa's apartheid regime. Prior to his capture, he acquired the nickname "Pangaman" (panga being a local word for the machete with which he mutilated his victims).

Xitavhudzi was arrested after selling a stolen watch which had belonged to one of his victims, prompting his arrest. In prison he confessed to all his crimes. He was quickly tried and convicted of 16 murders. Sentenced to death, he was hanged on 14 November 1960. He was the second in a series of at least a half-dozen serial killers to have plagued the township of Atteridgeville.

See also

Moses Sithole
Elifasi Msomi
Daisy de Melker
List of serial killers by country

References

1960 deaths
20th-century executions by South Africa
Executed South African serial killers
Male serial killers
People convicted of murder by South Africa
People executed by South Africa by hanging
People from Pretoria
Place of birth missing
Racially motivated violence against white people in Africa
South African people convicted of murder
Year of birth missing